Danny Roach (born 6 January 1982) was an Australian rules football player for the Collingwood Football Club in the Australian Football League (AFL).

Roach, a Tasmanian, played only one game for Collingwood after being a first round pick in the 1999 AFL Draft. He played his debut season at the club for Victorian Football League club Williamstown (Collingwood's affiliate team) before getting his chance in early 2001 against Richmond. Roach was unsuccessful in his AFL Debut, having only 1 tackle for the entire match, in what would be his first and last AFL game.

External links
 
 

1982 births
Collingwood Football Club players
Williamstown Football Club players
Living people
Australian rules footballers from Tasmania
Tassie Mariners players